The 2022–23 South Dakota Coyotes men's basketball team represented the University of South Dakota in the 2022–23 NCAA Division I men's basketball season. The Coyotes, led by first-year head coach Eric Peterson, played their home games at the Sanford Coyote Sports Center in Vermillion, South Dakota as members of the Summit League.

Previous season
The Coyotes finished the 2021–22 season 19–12, 11–7 in Summit League play to finish in fifth place. They defeated Kansas City in the quarterfinals of the Summit League tournament, before losing to South Dakota State in the semifinals.

On March 10, 2022, the school fired head coach Todd Lee after four years at the helm. On March 15, the school named Utah assistant Eric Peterson as the team's new head coach.

Roster

Schedule and results

|-
!colspan=12 style=""| Exhibition

|-
!colspan=12 style=""| Non-conference regular season

|-
!colspan=12 style=""| Summit League regular season

|-
!colspan=9 style=|Summit League tournament

Sources

References

South Dakota Coyotes men's basketball seasons
South Dakota Coyotes
South Dakota Coyotes men's basketball
South Dakota Coyotes men's basketball